State Route 63 (SR 63) is a  state highway in the northeastern part of the U.S. state of Georgia. It and SR 59 serve to connect Commerce and Toccoa.

Route description
SR 63 begins at an intersection with SR 59, northeast of Commerce. The route travels north-northeastward toward Toccoa. About  after its southern terminus, SR 63 has an interchange with Interstate 85 (I-85) in rural Banks County. This interchange is south-southeast of Arp. SR 63 continues to the north-northeast. It has intersections with SR 51, SR 198, and SR 184. The highway crosses the northwestern corner of Franklin County and enters Stephens County. SR 63 intersects SR 106 just north of the Franklin–Stephens county line. The two highways form a concurrency to the north-northeast. On the way to Toccoa, the route has an intersection with SR 17. Just before entering Toccoa, SR 63 has an intersection with SR 145 before traveling northwest and curve to the north until it meets its northern terminus, an intersection with US 123/SR 184/SR 365 in downtown Toccoa. This intersection also marks the northern terminus of SR 106.

Major intersections

See also

References

External links

 Georgia Roads (Routes 61 - 80)

063
Transportation in Banks County, Georgia
Transportation in Franklin County, Georgia
Transportation in Stephens County, Georgia